Georg Andreas Bull (26 March 1829 – 1 February 1917) was a Norwegian  architect and chief building inspector in Christiania (now Oslo) for forty years. He was among the major architects in the country, and performed surveying studies and archeological research.

Background
Bull was born in Bergen, Norway as the youngest of 10 siblings. He was a son of pharmacist Johan Storm Bull (1787–1838) and his wife Anna Dorothea Borse Geelmuyden (1789–1875). He was a brother of violinist Ole Bull and painter Knud Bull, an uncle of Edvard Hagerup Bull and Schak Bull, a granduncle of Sverre Hagerup Bull and a second cousin of Johan Randulf Bull and Anders Sandøe Ørsted Bull.

Bull received drawing lessons in Bergen by the German born architect and painter Franz Wilhelm Schiertz (1813–1887) from 1843 to 1845. He then studied machine engineering at the Polytechnische Schule in Hannover from 1846 to 1850, and continued his studies in England. After his engineering studies he made archeological studies of Haakon's Hall in Bergen and other buildings dating from the Middle Ages, including twenty stave churches. He studied architecture at the Berliner Bauakademie from 1855 to 1856.

Career
He started working as an architect in Kristiania during 1857, where his first significant work was Christiania Dampkjøkken. After a major fire in Kristiania in 1858 he started planning the villa area Homansbyen, where he also designed many of the buildings, during the period from 1858 to 1866. He was architect for the state railways (Statsbanene) from 1863 to 1872.

Bull's designs ranged from churches, villas and train stations to interiors and storehouses. Among his works are the two train stations in Oslo; Oslo Vestbanestasjon and Østbanen, and altogether about sixty train stations throughout the country. He designed railway stations of the Krøder Line, including the Krøderen Station (1872) and for  the Kongsvinger Line  at  Åbogen (1865), Matrand (1865) and Magnor (1865).

For his brother Ole Bull, he designed a new farmhouse in the summer resort at Valestrandfossen in Osterøy (1865) and probably also his newer oriental-styled villa on Lysøen in Os, outside Bergen ca. 1872.

Bull was a board member of the Royal Danish Academy of Art 1869–84 and the National Gallery of 1869.  He was a co-founder of the Norwegian Engineering and Architectural Association in 1874. Bull was a board member of the Society for the Preservation of Ancient Norwegian Monuments from 1853 to 1864  and of Christiania Theatre from 1866.  He was chairman for Selskabet for Christiania Byes Vel from 1904 to 1908.

He was decorated Knight, First Class of the Royal Norwegian Order of St. Olav in 1875 and was decorated Knight of the Order of the Dannebrog.

Personal life
He was married to Emilie Constance Hjelm (1832–1926) with whom he had nine children. They were the parents of architect Henrik Bull. He died in the neighborhood of Bestum in  the district of Ullern in Oslo during 1917.

Selected works

Høle Church (Høle kyrkje) - 1858
Vanylven Church  (Vanylven kyrkje) - 1864 
Kragerø church  (Kragerø kirke) - 1870
Oslo West Station  (Vestbanestasjonen) – 1872
Koppang Station (Gamle Koppang stasjon)- 1875
Oslo Central Station (Østbanestasjonen) -  1878
St. James Church   (Jakob kirke)  - 1880

References

External links
Family genealogy

Architects from Bergen
Norwegian expatriates in Germany
1829 births
1917 deaths
Knights of the Order of the Dannebrog